MDHS can refer to any of the following:

High schools
 Markham District High School, Markham, Ontario, Canada
 Mater Dei High School (disambiguation)
 Medical District High School, Memphis, Tennessee, USA
 Monsignor Donovan High School, Toms River, New Jersey, USA
 Mount Douglas High School, Saanich, British Columbia, Canada
 Milton District High School, Milton, Ontario, Canada
 Myungduk High School, Gangseo District, Seoul, South Korea

Other
 MDHS100, a standard for Surveying, sampling and assessment of asbestos containing materials produced by the UK  Health and Safety Laboratory
 Majlis Daerah Hulu Selangor, a local authority in Kuala Kubu Bharu in Malaysia
 Maryland Historical Society, abbreviated as "MdHS"
 The University of Melbourne Faculty of Medicine, Dentistry and Health Sciences
 Mississippi Department of Human Services